The second driverless car competition of the DARPA Grand Challenge was a  off-road course that began at 6:40 am on October 8, 2005, near the California/Nevada state line.   All but one of the 23 finalists in the 2005 race surpassed the  distance completed by the best vehicle in the 2004 race. Five vehicles successfully completed the course:

 

Vehicles in the 2005 race passed through three narrow tunnels and navigated more than 100 sharp left and right turns. The race concluded through Beer Bottle Pass, a winding mountain pass with sheer drop-offs on both sides. Although the 2004 course had required more elevation gain, and some very sharp switchbacks (Daggett Ridge) had been required near the beginning of the route, it had had far fewer curves and  roads than the 2005 course.

The natural rivalry between the teams from Stanford and Carnegie Mellon (Sebastian Thrun, head of the Stanford team was previously a faculty member at Carnegie Mellon and colleague of Red Whittaker, head of the CMU team) was played out during the race. Mechanical problems plagued H1ghlander before it was passed by Stanley. Gray Team's entry was a miracle in itself, as the team from the suburbs of New Orleans was caught in Hurricane Katrina several months before the race. The fifth finisher, Terramax, a 30,000-pound entry from Oshkosh Truck, finished on the second day. The huge truck spent the night idling on the course and was particularly nimble in carefully picking its way down the narrow roads of Beer Bottle Pass.

National Qualification Event (NQE) 

Of the original 195 applicants, initially 40 teams were selected to participate in the National Qualification Event (NQE). Three teams were added on Aug. 23, 2005 to the semi-finalist 40 teams who were selected from site visits, sending 43 teams to the NQE.

The National Qualification Event was held at California Speedway in Fontana from September 27 through October 5. The results of the NQE were used to cut the 43 teams down to 23 for the race on October 8.

Vehicle performances at the NQE were judged by (1) elapsed time to complete the course; (2) number of obstacles successfully passed without contact; (3) number of gates successfully passed. DARPA did not reveal the relative importance of these three factors. DARPA's final ranking of the vehicles, for purposes of pole position in the Grand Challenge Event (GCE), may have been partly subjective.

The results of the 2005 DARPA NQEs are shown below sorted top to bottom by runs completed and gates passed, compiled from DARPA's published NQE results. This ordering does not correspond to DARPA's ranking of team performance.  (For example, this ordering does not reflect speed as an element of performance.)  Teams highlighted in green were the teams that DARPA selected to participate in the Grand Challenge desert race.

There were four NQE runs. The above four major columns are sorted from worst to best runs of each team. "Time" signifies the time in minutes for a completed run and "x" indicates an incomplete run.  "Gates" indicates the number of gates along the track that were passed (there were 50 total per run).  "Obstacles" indicates the number of obstacles on the track that were passed (there were 5 total per run).  "Finishes" indicates the total number of runs that the team successfully completed (there were 4 runs total). "Total Gates" indicates the total number of gates that the team successfully passed. The teams are sorted from top to bottom according to runs completed and then by total gates passed. Teams indicated as a "desert race participant" are those teams invited by DARPA to participate in the Grand Challenge desert race.  Source data

For the first and second run, only 4 obstacles were present whereas for the third and fourth runs 5 obstacles were present. The NQE results presented in the table above show each team's runs sorted left to right from their worst run to their best run in order to better illustrate relative ranking (i.e. not in order of the actual run sequence). The ranking of who was accepted into the Grand Challenge desert race seems to be driven by number of gates passed. Beyond that, it is not known what criteria DARPA used to qualify the participants as acceptance was seemingly driven by decision of the Chief Judge.

On October 6, the selected teams transported their robots to the starting location. On October 7 the teams had a day to fix any portions of the robots broken in the course of transportation prior to the actual race.

Race

A Google Talk video about the DARPA 2005 race is available at YouTube

The route to be followed by the robots was supplied to the teams two hours before the start as a computer file with GPS coordinates, one every  of the route, with more frequent waypoints in difficult patches. Some teams used topographic maps and aerial imagery to manually map out and program precise path and speed settings. Once the race had started, the robots were not allowed to contact humans in any way.

Each robot started at a different time and was "paused" for different amounts of time during the race; DARPA compensated for the staggered start times and subtracted the pause time from each robot's total to derive its final official time. The $2 million prize was awarded on Sunday, October 9, 2005.

The 2005 competitors were much more successful than those of 2004; only one failed to pass the  mark set by the best-performing 2004 entry, Sandstorm. By the end, 18 robots had been disabled and five robots finished the course. On the first day, Stanley from Stanford University, and H1ghlander and Sandstorm from Carnegie Mellon University, finished within minutes of each other, with Stanley crossing the finish line first.  Kat-5 from Gray Team started much later, but finished in a comparable time. The race paused overnight with one competitor, TerraMax, left on the course at mile 83; TerraMax had the stage to itself on Sunday as it belatedly rumbled home.
    
Oshkosh Truck's Terramax finished at 12:51 and would not have been eligible for the prize because it exceeded the ten-hour limit.

The Official Website (requires Flash player plugin) contained a map and positions of the competitors, while TG Daily posted a running summary of the day's events.

Race participants 

DNF = did not finish

Team sites

American Industrial Magic 
Autonomous Vehicle Engineers (Team AVE)
Autonomous Vehicle Systems (semi-finalist 2005)
A.I. Motorvators  (semi-finalist 2004, 2005)
Armani (dead link, leave for history)
Austin Robot Technology (semi-finalist 2005)
Axion Racing (finalist 2004, 2005)
BJB Engineering (semi-finalist 2005)
Blue Revolution Racing(dead link, leave for history) 
BYUc  (New team 2007)
Blue Team (finalist 2004; semi-finalist 2005)
CarOLO
Cornell DARPA Team (finalist 2005)
CyberRider (semi-finalist 2004, 2005)
Desert Buckeyes  (2004, finalist 2005)
FutureNowa 
Grand Challenge Autonomous Race Team
Gray Team (finisher 2005)
The Golem Group (finalist 2004, 2005)
Highlander Racing
Insight Racing (semi-finalist 2004; finalist 2005)
KNetX
Maximum Exposure (dead link, leave for history)
Mech I.Q. (dead link, leave for history)
MonsterMoto JackBot (finalist 2005)
MITRE Meteorites (finalist 2005)
Oregon WAVE (semi-finalist 2005)
The Palos Verdes High School Road Warriors (finalist 2004; semi-finalist 2005)
Princeton University (finalist 2005)
The Prodigies
Red Team (finalist 2004; finisher 2005)
Red Team Too (finisher 2005)
ROVER SYSTEMS (semi-finalist 2004)
R Junk Works 
Stanford Racing Team (winner 2005)
Sting Racing at Georgia Tech (new team 2007)
SciAutonics (finalist 2004, 2005)
SciAutonics II (finalist 2004)
Tartan Racing (New CMU Team)
Team 1010Delta (dead link, leave for history)
Team Aggie Spirit - UC Davis (dead link, leave for history)
Team Arctic Tortoise (semi-finalist 2004)
Team Blue Revolution (dead link, leave for history)
Team CajunBot (finalist 2004, 2005)
Team Tormenta (semi-finalist 2005)
Team Cal Poly 
Team Caltech (finalist 2004, 2005)
Team Case (Combined with Team ENSCO)
Team CIMAR (finalist 2004, 2005)
Team Cybernet (2007 Site Visit Qualified)
Team ENSCO (finalist 2004, 2005)
Team Go It Alone
Team Jefferson (semi-finalist 2005)
Team Mexico  (new team 2007)
Team Overbot (semi-finalist 2004, 2005)
Team Rambo (dead link, leave for history)
Team Remote-I
Team Scorpion
Team South Carolina (dead link, leave for history)
Team Terramax (finalist 2004; finisher 2005)
Team Thunderbird - UBC
Team Underdawg 
Team Visionary Endeavor – Fox Valley Technical College
 UCF Team Knightrider
Viva Las Vegas (dead link, leave for history)
 Virginia Tech Grand Challenge Team Rocky (finalist 2005)
 Virginia Tech Grand Challenge Team Cliff (finalist 2004, 2005)

References

External links

Official sites 
The 2005 race results page

Technology
 Analysis of CART algorithm used by the winning Stanford team
CART source code used to distinguish the road from surrounding desert

TV & video coverage
NOVA: The Great Robot Race
 Pre-event videos of the competitors
 WMV Video showing the world through Stanley's laser-beam eyes.
Google Video: Lecture by Sebastian Thrun on winning the 2005 GC

Press coverage
 CNN.com: Robots fail to complete Grand Challenge
 Journal of Field Robotics, Special Issue on DARPA Grand Challenge, Part 1 
 Journal of Field Robotics, Special Issue on DARPA Grand Challenge, Part 2 
 News from the qualifying events and team blogs
 Wired Magazine article on the DARPA Grand Challenge and Stanley.
 Popular Mechanics article on the DARPA Grand Challenge.
 Popular Science article on the DARPA Grand Challenge.
 Scientific American article on the DARPA Grand Challenge.
 NOVA: The Great Robot Race